John Bender was a member of the Ohio House of Representatives from 1993–2000.  His district consisted of a portion of Lorain County, Ohio.  He was succeeded by Jeffrey Manning. Bender was previously an at-large member of the Elyria, Ohio city council. After leaving the statehouse he served as a member of the Ohio Democratic Party State Central Committee. He served on the Ohio State Board of Education from 2007-2010. A 1956 graduate of Pittsburgh Central Catholic High School, he earned his BS in 1960, his Masters in 1962, and his PhD in 1969 from the University of Pittsburgh. He was employed as an educator, serving as the Director of Student Activities at University of Pittsburgh, Penn State New Kensington and LCCC. John was an Outplacement and Retraining Counselor/Consultant. He was also a delegate for Democratic National Conventions in 1984, 1988, and 2004. He died February 2, 2018.

References

Democratic Party members of the Ohio House of Representatives
Living people
Year of birth missing (living people)
University of Pittsburgh alumni